State Highway 64 (SH 64) is a state highway in Kerala, India that starts in Varkala municipality of Trivandrum and ends in Madathara of Kollam. The highway is 45 km long.

The Route Map 
Varkala - Kannamba - Nadayara -  Palayamkunnu - Chavarcode -  Parippally (Cross- NH 66) -Pallickal-Nilamel (cross (SH 1) MC Road)- Kadakkal - Chithara - Madathara (Joined SH 02). The main disadvantage is vehicle has to cross a railway gate in Varkala near to Railway Station. Govt. is proposed a railway over bridge to cross this hurdle. But the construction is not yet started.

See also 
Roads in Kerala
List of State Highways in Kerala

References 

State Highways in Kerala
Roads in Thiruvananthapuram district
Roads in Kollam district